Richard Peter Moore  (born 9 May 1963) is a British civil servant, currently chief of the Secret Intelligence Service (MI6) and formerly Director General for Political Affairs, at the Foreign, Commonwealth and Development Office, and previously the British ambassador to Turkey. In 2020, Moore became the first member of the British intelligence agencies to use social media publicly.

Education
Moore attended St George's College, Weybridge, an independent school in Surrey. Afterwards, he studied philosophy, politics and economics at Worcester College, Oxford where he gained a Bachelor of Arts. He then won a Kennedy Scholarship to study at the Kennedy School of Government in Harvard University. In 2007, he attended the Stanford Executive Program.

Career
Moore's notable career has been in the Foreign, Commonwealth and Development Office (FCDO) and in His Majesty's Diplomatic Service. He has had postings in Vietnam in 1988, Turkey in 1990 and from 1991 to 1992, Pakistan from 1995 to 1998, Iran from 1992 to 1995 and Malaysia from 2001 to 2005 where he undertook a variety of roles, including working for the Secret Intelligence Service. He was the section head of the Security Policy Group at the FCDO from 1998 to 2001 and Deputy Director of the Middle East from 2005 to 2008.

Moore, more recently, was Director for Programmes and Change from 2008 to 2010, and Director for Europe, Latin America and Globalization from 2010 to 2012.

Moore's first prominent appointment was as Ambassador of the United Kingdom to Turkey. He held this post from 2014 to 2017. He spent a short period of time working as Deputy National Security Advisor (Intelligence, Security and Resilience) in 2018. He held the appointment of Director-General, Political in the FCDO from 2018 until August 2020. On the 29 July 2020, it was announced that Moore would become Chief of the Secret Intelligence Service (MI6) in autumn 2020. He took up this position on the 1 October of the same year.

Moore was the first member of the British secret service to openly use Twitter, when on 2 October 2020 his tweets from his first day as Chief of MI6 made the news for their humorous hashtags and emojis.

On 5 May 2021 Moore announced that MI6 had begun "green spying", to secretly investigate if foreign nations were genuinely keeping to their emission reduction commitments in order to tackle climate change.

In February 2021, Moore apologised publicly to MI6 officers who were dismissed from the agency under the ban on  LGBT staff prior to 1991, and called the policy "wrong, unjust and discriminatory".

Personal life
Richard Moore was born in Tripoli, Libya on the 9 May 1963. He married Margaret Martin (Maggie) in 1985, with whom he has had a son and a daughter.

Moore's grandfather Jack Buckley served as a soldier of the Irish Republican Army from 1916 to 1922 in Cork, Ireland, and was awarded a medal by Sinn Fein for fighting against British rule.

He is fluent in Turkish. Moore was made a Companion (CMG) of the Order of St Michael and St George on 31 December 2016 for services to UK/Turkey relations.

References

|-

|-

1963 births
Living people
People educated at St George's College, Weybridge
Alumni of Worcester College, Oxford
Harvard University alumni
21st-century British diplomats
Ambassadors of the United Kingdom to Turkey
British expatriates in Pakistan
Companions of the Order of St Michael and St George